HMS Nabthorpe was a Royal Navy Mobile Naval Operating Air Base (MONAB) at the Royal Australian Air Force (RAAF) base RAAF Station Schofields at Schofields, New South Wales. HMS Nabthorpe was also known as MONAB III and Royal Naval Air Station (RNAS) Schofields.

History
Assembled at RNAS Ludham on 18 October 1944, MONAB III was commissioned as an independent command bearing the ship's name HMS Nabthorpe on 4 December 1944.

The main party arrived in Sydney on 25 January 1945 and were accommodated at HMS Golden Hind, Camp Warwick, a part of the Royal Navy barracks in Sydney, whilst awaiting the allocation of an operating base and the arrival of SS Essex, which arrived at Sydney on 4 February 1945.

An advance party was sent to RAAF Schofields on 5 February 1945 to prepare the airfield for the arrival of squadron personnel and aircraft which were to arrive with the British Pacific Fleet. Upon arrival of the main party of personnel they were accommodated under canvas tents as the station had no permanent buildings at the time.

RAAF Schofields was officially transferred to the Royal Navy and commissioned as HMS Nabthorpe, RNAS Schofields, on 18 February 1945.

The successful pilots were to form the nucleus of the Royal Australian Navy Fleet Air Arm.

No. 7 Carrier Air Group formed at RNAS Schofields on 30 June 1945, from ’s air squadrons, No.s 887 & 894 (Seafire), 820 (Avenger) and 1770 (Firefly) squadrons.

The Commander in Chief of the British Pacific Fleet, Admiral Sir Bruce Fraser, visited Schofields on 28 July 1945 as part of his tour of the support facilities in Australia.

HMS Nabthorpe, MONAB III, was paid off on 15 November 1945 and RNAS Schofields re-commissioned as HMS Nabstock (MONAB VI) on the same day.

Commanding Officer/s
 Commander (A) E.W. Kenton  - 4 December 1944

Units based at HMS Nabthorpe
 702 Instrument Flying Training & Checking Squadron
 Crew Pool & Refresher Flying School
 Mobile Maintenance 2
 Maintenance Servicing 3 & 4
 Seafire Pool Squadron
 Seafire Operational Training Unit

Squadrons based at HMS Nabthorpe
 706 Squadron (3 March - 28 August 1945) (Avenger, Barracuda, Corsair, Firefly, Hellcat & Seafire)
 801 Squadron (9–11 September 1945)
 814 Squadron (21 July - 13 August 1945) (Barracuda)
 820 squadron (1 June - 1 July 1945) (Avengers)
 837 Squadron (16 August - 1 September 1945)
 880 Squadron (25 August - 11 September 1945) (Seafire IIIs)
 885 Squadron  (20 March - 4 April 1945) & (30 September 1945 disbanded) (Hellcat Is)
 887 Squadron (10–27 February 1945), (5 June - 7 July 1945) & (30 September - 15 November 1945) (Seafire IIIs)
 894 Squadron (10–27 February 1945), (5 June - 7 July 1945) & (30 September 1945) (Seafire IIIs)
 899 Squadron (23 April - 18 September 1945)
 1770 Squadron (10–27 February 1945), (5 July - 29 August 1945) (Firefly Is)
 1772 Squadron (18 May - 7 July 1945) & (30 September 1945) (Firefly Is)
 1790 Squadron (13 August 1945 (Firefly NF 1's)
 1831 Squadron (16 August - 1 September 1945) 
 1834 Squadron (5–26 June 1945) (Corsairs)
 1836 Squadron (5–26 June 1945) (Corsairs)
 1840 Squadron (23 February - 9 May 1945) (Hellcats)
 1843 Squadron (1–20 May 1945) (Corsair IVs)
 1845 Squadron (26 February - 11 May 1945) (Corsair IVs)
 1851 Squadron (21 July - 13 August 1945) (Corsair)

Aircraft carriers squadrons disembarked from/embarked to
 
 
 
 
 
 
 HMS Ruler
 HMS Slinger
 HMS Speaker
 
 
 HMS Vindex

Satellite Airfields
 Woy Woy Aerodrome

References
 

Royal Naval Air Stations
Military history of Sydney during World War II